Tarfu Lake is a lake of Yukon, Canada. The lake is both fed and drained by Tarfu Creek. The name is from WWII-era Military slang, an acronym for Things Are Really Fouled Up.

See also
List of lakes in Yukon

References
 National Resources Canada

Lakes of Yukon